Nook is a hamlet in Juniata County, Pennsylvania, United States. Nook is located in Beale Township, along Pennsylvania Route 35, with a zip code of 17058. Mennonites and other persons of Pennsylvania Dutch descent inhabit the small settlement.

References

 
http://www.usa-zipcodes.com/zipcode-lookup_17058.html

Unincorporated communities in Juniata County, Pennsylvania
Unincorporated communities in Pennsylvania